Carley Garner (born 1977) is an American commodity market strategist and futures and options broker and the author of "Higher Probability Commodity Trading" published by DT publishing an imprint of Wyatt-MacKenzie.  She has also written four books published by FT Press, Currency Trading in the FOREX and Futures Markets, A Trader's First Book on Commodities (two editions), and Commodity Options.  Commodity Options was named one of the "Top 10 Investing & Trading Books of 2009" by SFO Magazine. A Trader's First Book on Commodities (2nd Ed.) was named as the best futures trading book in 2021 by a UK financial education website. Garner was also featured in FT Press' e-book series entitled "Insights for the Agile Investor", and an educational video series.

Carley Garner, considered an expert in commodity market technical analysis, is a regular contributor to the Mad Money television show hosted by Jim Cramer on CNBC; she is also a colleague of Cramer's at RealMoney.com, the premium service of TheStreet.com.

She has been featured by Technical Analysis of Stocks & Commodities magazine as a monthly columnist since early 2008 and is a RealMoney.com contributor to TheStreet.com.

Early life and education
After Garner graduated from Monticello High School in Monticello, Utah in 1996, she attended Snow College where she earned an associate's degree. In 2003, she graduated from the University of Nevada, Las Vegas with bachelor's degrees in accounting and finance with Magna Cum Laude accolades.

Career
During her time in the commodity industry, Garner has participated in several radio interviews and is often quoted and referenced in business news publications such as The Wall Street Journal and monthly print publications such as Futures Magazine. In addition to a monthly column in Stocks & Commodities Magazine, her work is also published in multiple national magazines and on several industry trading education websites, including TheStreet.com, InsideFutures.com, TradersLog.com and many others.

Garner's chart analysis is frequently featured on the Mad Money TV show on CNBC.  On the show, Jim Cramer discusses the commodity market analysis of Carley Garner on markets such as gold, crude oil, natural gas, and Treasuries.

Although Garner is most known for her published efforts, she has become a regular on the speaking circuit and also performs online seminars, known as webinars, for various futures industry cyber venues including online classes for the New York Institute of Finance, BigMikeTrading.com, MoneyShow.com, and others.

Garner began her career as a commodity broker in the Las Vegas branch of Alaron Trading in March 2004. By 2006 she was named as a branch manager and a senior analyst.  In the fall of 2008, Garner ventured away from Alaron and began working for a guaranteed introducing broker for PFGBest.com, DeCarley Trading LLC also located in Las Vegas, Nevada. In July 2012, DeCarley Trading joined the Zaner Group to become an independent introducing broker; DeCarley Trading is currently operating as a branch of the Zaner Group. At DeCarley Trading, Garner is a senior strategist and head commodity broker where she writes daily and monthly market newsletters for the firm's clients as well as facilitates trading and contract execution.

Bibliography
 2016: Higher Probability Commodity Trading: . – 
 2012: Currency Trading in the Forex and Futures Markets. – 
 2012: A Trader's First Book on Commodities: An Introduction to the World's Fastest Growing Market, Second Edition. – 
 2010: A Trader's First book on Commodities: An introduction to the World's Fastest Growing Market, First Edition. –  
 2009: Commodity Options: Trading and Hedging Volatility in the World's Most Lucrative Market. –

References

External links
DeCarley Trading
Higher Probability Commodity Trading
Carley Garner Trading Education

Living people
American financial analysts
Snow College alumni
University of Nevada, Las Vegas alumni
American commodities traders
People from San Juan County, Utah
1977 births